Kneeling at the Shrine is a 1991 studio album by the British rock band Sunday All Over the World, consisting of singer Toyah Willcox, her husband, guitarist Robert Fripp, Chapman Stick player Trey Gunn, and drummer Paul Beavis.

Background
The band formed in 1988 and played a short tour under the name Fripp Fripp, during which Toyah performed material from her then-most recent album Prostitute as a support act. Then, having changed their name to Sunday All Over the World, they played more dates in 1989. Kneeling at the Shrine was the band's first and only studio album, released by E.G. Records in 1991, after which they disbanded. The album does not include all songs that the band was performing at the concerts. Two of those songs, "Brilliant Day" and "Lords of the Never Known", were released around the same time on Toyah's solo album Ophelia's Shadow. Although Willcox and Fripp are a married couple since 1986, this band was one of the few instances in which the two musicians worked together professionally.

Track listing
All songs written by Sunday All Over the World, except "Freedom" written by Robert Fripp and Toyah Willcox.

Personnel
Credits adapted from liner notes.

 Toyah Willcox – vocals, mixing
 Robert Fripp – guitar, mixing, mastering
 Trey Gunn – stick, vocals, overdubs, mixing
 Paul Beavis – drums, percussion

 David Singleton – mixing, mastering, overdubs
 Tony Arnold – mastering
 Tony Cousins – mastering

 Douglas Brothers – photography
 Bill Smith – cover design

References

1991 albums
E.G. Records albums
Art rock albums by British artists
Progressive rock albums by British artists